Colfax Township is a township in Daviess County, in the U.S. state of Missouri.

Colfax Township has the name of Schuyler Colfax, 17th Vice President of the United States.

References

Townships in Missouri
Townships in Daviess County, Missouri